August L. Creely   was a Major League Baseball player. He played shortstop in four games for  the St. Louis Browns of the American Association during the 1890 baseball season. He played primarily in the minor leagues from 1887–1896.

Sources

Major League Baseball shortstops
St. Louis Browns (AA) players
Baseball players from Missouri
1870 births
1934 deaths
19th-century baseball players
Hot Springs Blues players
Leavenworth Soldiers players
Waco Babies players
Waco Texans players
Aurora Maroons players
Dallas Navigators players
Denison Tigers players
Burlington Colts players